Taqanak (also Romanized as Ţāqānak; also known as Ţāgānak and Tufang) is a city in the Central District of Shahrekord County, Chaharmahal and Bakhtiari province, Iran. At the 2006 census, its population was 5,504 in 1,433 households. The following census in 2011 counted 5,941 people in 1,717 households. The latest census in 2016 showed a population of 6,170 people in 1,942 households. The city is populated by Turkic people.

References 

Shahrekord County

Cities in Chaharmahal and Bakhtiari Province

Populated places in Chaharmahal and Bakhtiari Province

Populated places in Shahr-e Kord County